Rob Walker Racing Team was a privateer team in Formula One during the 1950s and 1960s. Founded by Johnnie Walker heir Rob Walker (1917–2002) in 1953, the team became F1's most successful privateer in history, being the first and (along with FISA team) only entrant to win a World Championship Formula One Grand Prix without ever building their own car.

Beginnings

Born in 1917, the 35-year-old Rob Walker founded his team in 1953, debuting in the Lavant Cup Formula 2 race, entering a Connaught for driver Tony Rolt, where he achieved a third place. The next race, at Snetterton, Eric Thompson was the first winner with a Rob Walker car. Between Rolt and Thompson, the Rob Walker Racing Team had an auspicious debut season, with eight wins in British club racing series. Their international debut was at the Rouen Grand Prix, a mixed F1/F2 race, with Stirling Moss's Cooper-Alta, who managed to take 4th place among the F2 cars. The 1953 British Grand Prix was Walker's first World Championship outing, but Rolt's Connaught did not last the full distance.

Walker, who entered his cars in Scottish national colours (blue with a white stripe, instead of the more common British racing green), continued to race in British club events in the following years. From 1954 to 1956, Walker made a few scattered appearances, only winning a Formula 2 race at Brands Hatch in 1956 with Tony Brooks. Walker returned full-time in 1957 with an F2 Cooper-Climax. Tony Brooks, who shared driving duties during the season with Jack Brabham and Noel Cunningham-Reid, won the Lavant Cup, but the team failed to finish most of its races.

Internationalization

In 1958, Rob Walker abandoned club racing and concentrated only on the large international events. Pre-WWII veteran Maurice Trintignant was signed full-time, with Moss and Brooks racing when they were free from their Vanwall commitments. The season started well enough for the team, with Moss and Trintignant winning at Argentina and Monaco, the first wins for a Cooper chassis. Those would be the only World Championship victories, but Trintignant also triumphed at Pau and Auvergne, while Moss took the victory at the BARC 200, Caen Grand Prix and Kentish 100.

Moss and Trintignant remained with the team for 1959, with the British driver winning at the Glover Trophy in Goodwood, but for the French and British GP races, he left Walker for his father's British Racing Partnership outfit, where he failed to score. Moss returned in the German Grand Prix, where he retired, but returned to winning form in Portugal, Italy and International Gold Cup. Trintignant's best score was second place at the US Grand Prix.

Walker decided to concentrate solely on Moss and switched to a Lotus in 1960, starting from Monaco, which Moss won, the first time a Lotus won a Formula 1 race. Moss would triumph only at the non-championship International Gold Cup in Oulton Park and the US GP at Riverside, but still managed to finish the season in third place overall, as had happened the previous year. After the end of the season, in December, Walker took Moss to two South African races, which he won.

In 1961, F1 adopted the new 1.5 L engine regulations, and Walker flirted with the idea of building his own chassis,  but retained the Lotus 18 for the season. Moss won the non-championship races at Goodwood in the 2.5 L Intercontinental Formula and Vienna, as well as the Monaco and German Grands Prix. At the 1961 British Grand Prix, Rob Walker Racing became the first team ever to enter a four-wheel drive car for a World Championship Grand Prix, when they entered the Ferguson P99 on behalf of Ferguson Research. Moss later won that season's Oulton Park International Gold Cup race in the same car; to date, this is the only win ever recorded by a four-wheel drive car in a Formula One event.

The post-Moss era

The 1962 season started well enough, with the returning Trintignant winning at Pau, but Walker's plans were shaken when Moss had an accident at the Goodwood Glover Trophy meeting driving a BRP-entered Lotus, finishing his career. Walker had planned to enter a Ferrari for the British driver in the World Championship, but was forced to retain Trintignant, the elder French driver becoming increasingly uncompetitive, not scoring a single championship point. The year's misfortunes continued in Mexico and South Africa, where Walker saw drivers Ricardo Rodriguez and Gary Hocking die at the wheel of his cars.

Rob Walker changed strategy for 1963, employing Jo Bonnier and returning to the Cooper chassis (the Swede had raced for Walker at Oulton Park the previous year), but once more results were sparse and mechanical failures frequent. Still, the team beefed up its operations for 1964, first with a new Cooper (with which Bonnier was second at Snetterton) and then with a Brabham-BRM, with Bonnier and other guest drivers driving at several World Championship events. From the Italian GP, Walker had decided to run two cars, a BT11 chassis with BRM power, and a BT7 chassis with Climax power. In 1965, Jo Siffert partnered Bonnier, and although the more experienced Swede was fastest, it was the Swiss who managed to score 5 championship points. With constant mechanical failure plaguing him, Bonnier's best result was a third place at the non-championship Race of Champions.

With the new 3.0 L regulations starting in 1966, Bonnier left Walker to restart Ecurie Bonnier, and Siffert remained alone with Walker, with the Maserati-engined Cooper T81. The car was uncompetitive in 1967, and in 1968 Walker, now partnered with entrepreneur Jack Durlacher, purchased a Cosworth-powered Lotus 49. That year, Siffert won the British Grand Prix through attrition, after the works Lotuses retired, and Siffert overpowered Chris Amon to take what would be Rob Walker's final win.

Siffert left the team at the end of 1969, after finishing the year in 9th place, and Rob Walker Racing Team competed for the last time in 1970, entering a Lotus 72 for driver Graham Hill, who was now 40 years old, and refused to retire after a major accident in the previous year with Lotus. Hill's best score was a 4th placement at the Spanish GP, but he left to join Brabham at the end of the year.

Walker after Walker Racing

Retirement from racing

Instead of continuing with the team, Rob Walker took his Brooke Bond Oxo sponsorship to Surtees for the 1971-73 seasons, and took to managing Mike Hailwood's career. The last vestiges of Rob Walker Racing Team ended in 1974 when he retired from active participation in motorsports at the age of 57.

Journalism
Rob Walker also gained some measure of recognition as a motorsports journalist, covering Formula 1 events for Road & Track magazine. Beginning with a report on the Italian Grand Prix in 1967, Walker wrote race reports, annual reviews, and historical articles for Road & Track well into the 1990s.

Walker's death and legacy
Considered one of the elder statesmen of Grand Prix racing, Walker died at the age of 84 in 2002, of pneumonia.

Complete Formula One World Championship results
(key) (Results in bold indicate pole position; results in italics indicate fastest lap; † indicates shared drive.) 

£ Formula Two car

‡ Formula Two cars occupied fifth to tenth positions on the road in the 1969 German Grand Prix. However, as the Formula Two cars were technically competing in a separate race drivers of these cars were not eligible for championship points. The points for fifth and sixth were awarded to the drivers of the eleventh and twelfth placed cars.

Notes

References
Grand Prix Encyclopedia
F2 & Le Mans Register

External links

Grand Prix History: Hall of Fame Rob Walker

Formula One entrants
British auto racing teams
Lotus Cars
Walker
24 Hours of Le Mans teams